John Hewitt "Joe" Rouse (13 May 1883 – 1 June 1951) was an Australian rules footballer who played with Collingwood in the Victorian Football League (VFL).

Notes

External links 

Joe Rouse's profile at Collingwood Forever

1883 births
1951 deaths
Australian rules footballers from Melbourne
Collingwood Football Club players
People from Collingwood, Victoria